Cyriaque Mayounga-Ngolou (born 4 October 2000) is a professional footballer who plays as a defender. Born in France, he represents the Central African Republic national football team.

International career
Mayounga-Ngolou was born in Lyon to a Central African father, and Moroccan mother. At the age of 17 years and one month, Mayounga become the youngest ever player of Central African Republic on 14 November 2017, making his international debut in a friendly 3–0 loss to Algeria coming in as a late sub replacing his Olympique Lyonnais teammate Dylan Mboumbouni.

Career statistics

Club

International

References

External links
 
 OLWeb Profile
 
 

2000 births
Living people
Footballers from Lyon
Association football defenders
Citizens of the Central African Republic through descent
Central African Republic footballers
Central African Republic international footballers
French footballers
Central African Republic people of Moroccan descent
French sportspeople of Moroccan descent
French sportspeople of Central African Republic descent
Expatriate footballers in Slovakia
Olympique Lyonnais players
Wolverhampton Wanderers F.C. players
FK Senica players
MFK Dukla Banská Bystrica players
Slovak Super Liga players